Noteflight is an online community for sharing and notating music. As of March 2022, Noteflight consisted of 6.7 million registered users. Registered users may compose and notate music in Noteflight for free, while premium membership is required in order to use other advanced features such as sound recording.

See also
Musescore
Lilypond
Music Production

External links
Noteflight Official Website

References

 music software
 Scorewriters